The Dart Skycycle is an American single-seat, high wing, strut-braced, single-engine, conventional landing gear ultralight aircraft that was designed by Robert Dart and produced by Dart Aircraft of Mayville, New York for amateur construction.

Design and development
Introduced in 1985, the Skycycle is a single-seater designed as an FAR 103 Ultralight Vehicles-compliant aircraft with an empty weight within that category's  empty weight limit.

The aircraft has a 4130 steel tube frame fuselage and a wing constructed from spruce, all covered in doped fabric. The landing gear is bungee-suspended. The Skycycle can be built with an open cockpit or fully enclosed, allowing flying in cooler weather. The Skycycle was available as plans only or with some prefabricated components, such as the welded fuselage or assembled wings already completed. The standard engine specified was the  Rotax 277.

Reviewer Andre Cliche wrote: "The Skycycle is an ultralight-legal aircraft that resembles the average taildraggers of the 40s and 50s. It looks like a 'real airplane' and should satisfy the more conservative pilots who hesitate to fly 'colourful lawn chairs' as basic ultralights are sometimes called. It is a good all-around ultralight that is easy to fly and cheap to operate."

Specifications (Skycycle)

See also

References

1980s United States ultralight aircraft